Orofacial pain is a general term covering any pain which is felt in the mouth, jaws and the face. Orofacial pain is a common symptom, and there are many causes.

Orofacial Pain (OFP) is the specialty of dentistry that encompasses the diagnosis, management and treatment of pain disorders of the jaw, mouth, face and associated regions. These disorders as they relate to orofacial pain include but are not limited to temporomandibular muscle and joint (TMJ) disorders, jaw movement disorders, neuropathic and neurovascular pain disorders, headache, and sleep disorders.

Classification

International Classification of Diseases (ICD-11) is a new classification coming into effect as of January 1, 2022. It includes chronic secondary headaches and orofacial pain. The classification has been established by a close cooperation between International Association for the Study of Pain (IASP), World Health Organization (WHO) and the International Headache Society (IHS).

There are 4 main classifications prior to ICD-11 which attempt to classify the causes of orofacial pain.
 The International Classification of Headache Disorders third edition (ICHD-3), a publication by the International Headache Society. https://ichd-3.org/
 The Classification of Chronic Pain Second Edition (Revised), a publication by the International Association for the Study of Pain.
 Orofacial Pain: Guidelines for Assessment, Diagnosis, and Management, Fifth Edition by American Academy of Orofacial Pain (AAOP): www.aaop.org.
 The Research Diagnostic Criteria for Temporomandibular Disorders (see TMD).

It has also been suggested that the most basic etiologic classification of orofacial pain is into the following 3 groups:
 Primarily somatic, arising from musculoskeletal (e.g. TMD pain or periodontal pain) or visceral structures (e.g. pulpal pain or pain from the salivary glands), and transmitted via an intact pain transmission and modulation system.
 Primarily neuropathic, which occurs as a result of abnormal or damaged pain pathways, e.g. a surgical or traumatic injury to a peripheral nerve.
 Primarily psychological, which is rare (See: psychogenic pain)

Diagnosis 
Diagnosis of orofacial pain can be difficult and can require multiple examinations and histories provided by the patient. The pain history is essential and will indicate any further examinations required.

The correct diagnosis of orofacial pain requires an in-depth pain history which will include:
 Location of the pain
 Timing
 Duration
 Associated symptoms
 Exacerbating and alleviating factors 
 Description of the type of pain experienced e.g. dull, aching, throbbing, burning, tingling or pulsating.

Other information and examinations include:
 Full medical history
 Full dental history
 Full social history
 Clinical examination
 Radiographic examination

Differential diagnosis
Clinical presentation of orofacial pain.

Dental related 
 Pulpal
 Dentinal hypersensitivity resulting from
 Caries
 Toothwear
 Pulp disease (reversible and irreversible pulpitis) resulting from
 Caries
 Trauma
 Periapical pathology and periapical acute abscess
 Periodontal
 Periodontal abscess
 Pericoronitis and pericoronal abscess
 Cracked tooth syndrome

Non-dental related 
 Musculoskeletal including Temporomandibular diseases (TMD)
 Neuralgias and neuropathies
 Trigeminal neuralgia
 Glossopharyngeal neuralgia
 Sphenopalatine Ganglion neuralgia
 Sluder's Neuralgia
 Mental nerve neuralgia
 Post-injury
 Burning mouth syndrome
 Postherpetic neuralgia
 Persistent idiopathic facial pain (atypical facial pain)
 Atypical odontalgia
 Mucosal
 Traumatic, immunologic, infective, erosive, ulcerative and vesiculobullous lesions e.g. oral ulceration (e.g. aphthous stomatitis, erosive oral lichen planus, etc.)
 Psychosomatic
 Sinonasal
 Rhinosinusitis
 Headaches
 Cluster
 Migraine
 Tension-type
 Neoplastic
 Aneurysm
 Salivary gland disease
 Sialadenitis
 Sialoithiasis
 Cardiac toothache
 Eagle syndrome

Management 
A multi-disciplinary approach is needed for orofacial pain disorders involving both non-pharmacological and pharmacological approaches which can be applied to the specific type of disorder. Non-pharmacological approaches can include physical therapies and psychological support to effectively manage the facial pain and reduce the negative impact on quality of life and daily functioning. Self-management interventions, such as education, jaw posture relaxation, and cognitive or behavioral self regulation, have been shown to improve long-term outcomes for patients with orofacial pain, specifically in patients with TMD.  Self-Administration of Sphenopalatine Ganglion Blocks (SPG or Pterygopalatine Ganglion) is an excellent approach to a wide variety of orofacial pain conditions.

Often chronic orofacial pain (lasting over 12 weeks) requires referral to a specialised branch of medicine or dentistry or continuation of treatment in a primary care setting, if symptoms cannot be managed otherwise.
 Oral and maxillofacial referral for TMD
 Primary care referral for tension-type headaches
 Neurology referral for migraines and cluster headaches
 Ear Nose and Throat referral for rhinosinusitis and midfacial segment pain

Epidemiology
Orofacial pain is common problem. For example, in the United States, one report estimated that 22% of the general population had experienced some form of facial pain at some point in the 6-month period before questioning, of which 12% was toothache. In the United Kingdom, 7% of the general population reported having some degree of chronic orofacial pain. Other reports indicate a prevalence of 10–15% for TMD in the general population.

A systematic review looking at the prevalence of orofacial pain found that highest prevalence was for pain on opening the mouth (21%-49%), muscle tenderness (17%-97%) and self-reported joint pain (5%-31%).

See also
 Jaw claudication

References

External links 
 BMJ Infographic - Identification and initial management of chronic orofacial pain

 
Pain
Symptoms and signs: Nervous and musculoskeletal systems